This is a list of indoor arenas in the United States.

List of largest municipal and privately-owned arenas in the United States by seating capacity
This is a list of seating capacities for sports and entertainment arenas in the United States with at least 1,000 seats. The list is composed mostly of arenas that house sports teams (basketball, ice hockey and arena football) and serve as indoor venues for concerts and expositions. The arenas in this table are ranked by maximum capacity. Domed stadiums (such as the Superdome in New Orleans and the U.S. Bank Stadium in Minneapolis) are excluded from this list.

Rows shaded in yellow indicates arena is permanent home to an NBA, NHL, or WNBA franchise.

Future

Historic

Note: "Historic" denotes either demolished, not in practical use or unused.
Amway Arena – Orlando, Florida
ARCO Arena (1985) – Sacramento, California
Bayfront Arena – St. Petersburg, Florida
Boston Garden – Boston
Bradley Center – Milwaukee (also known as BMO Harris Bradley Center)
Britt Brown Arena at Kansas Coliseum – Valley Center, Kansas 
Brown County Veterans Memorial Arena – Green Bay, Wisconsin
Buffalo Memorial Auditorium – Buffalo, New York
Capital Centre – Landover, Maryland (also known as USAir Arena and US Airways Arena during its existence)
Charlotte Coliseum – Charlotte, North Carolina
Chicago Coliseum – Chicago
Chicago Stadium – Chicago
Civic Arena – Pittsburgh (also known as Mellon Arena)
Cleveland Arena – Cleveland, Ohio
Coconut Grove Convention Center – Miami (formerly known as the Dinner Key Auditorium)
Coliseum at Richfield – Richfield, Ohio
Compaq Center – Houston (formerly known as The Summit; now the main worship center for Lakewood Church)
Curtis Hixon Hall – Tampa, Florida
Denver Coliseum – Denver
Duquesne Gardens – Pittsburgh
The Forum – Inglewood, California (also known as the Great Western Forum)
Hara Arena – Trotwood, Ohio
HemisFair Arena – San Antonio, Texas
Hollywood Sportatorium – Pembroke Pines, Florida
International Amphitheatre – Chicago
Island Garden – West Hempstead, New York (original arena demolished in 1973)
Jacksonville Memorial Coliseum – Jacksonville, Florida
Joe Louis Arena – Detroit
Kiel Auditorium – St. Louis, Missouri (Enterprise Center stands on the site)
Kingdome – Seattle
Long Island Arena – Commack, New York
Los Angeles Memorial Sports Arena – Los Angeles
Madison Square Garden (second) – New York (built on the site of the first Madison Square Garden; the New York Life Building now stands on the site)
Madison Square Garden (third) – New York (demolished in 1968; used as a parking lot until One Worldwide Plaza was built on the site in 1989)
 Note: The first Madison Square Garden was not an indoor arena. Although used for many sports, it had no roof.
Market Square Arena – Indianapolis
McNichols Sports Arena – Denver, Colorado
Metropolitan Sports Center – Bloomington, Minnesota
Mid-South Coliseum – Memphis, Tennessee
Minneapolis Auditorium – Minneapolis
Motor Square Garden – Pittsburgh
Municipal Auditorium – New Orleans
New Haven Veterans Memorial Coliseum – New Haven, Connecticut
Olympia Stadium – Detroit
Omni Coliseum – Atlanta (State Farm Arena now stands on the site)
Philadelphia Arena – Philadelphia
Philadelphia Civic Center – Philadelphia
Philadelphia Convention Hall – Philadelphia 
Pyramid Arena – Memphis, Tennessee (now a Bass Pro Shops megastore)
San Francisco Civic Auditorium – San Francisco
St. Louis Arena – St. Louis, Missouri (also known as the Checkerdome)
St. Paul Civic Center – Saint Paul, Minnesota
Salt Palace – Salt Lake City
Sam Houston Coliseum – Houston
Sleep Train Arena – Sacramento, California (also known as the second ARCO Arena, and later as Power Balance Pavilion)
The Spectrum – Philadelphia (also known as CoreStates Spectrum, First Union Spectrum and Wachovia Spectrum)
Teaneck Armory – Teaneck, New Jersey
War Memorial Gymnasium – San Francisco
Washington Coliseum – Washington, D.C. (formerly Uline Arena)

List of largest university-owned sports arenas in the United States by seating capacity 

This table includes indoor arenas by seating capacity, which are owned and operated by universities and colleges and serve as home to college sports teams. Arenas with a capacity of at least 10,000 are included. Arenas which are shared by both professional and college teams, appear on the table of municipal arenas above. Domed stadiums are excluded from this list, with the exception of those which can be configured to serve as the home of major college basketball programs (i.e. the JMA Wireless Dome).

List of largest university-owned sports arenas in the United States by seating capacity, below 10,000 capacity 

This table includes indoor arenas by seating capacity, which are owned and operated by universities and colleges and serve as home to college sports teams. Arenas with a capacity of at least 5,000 are included.

Future

See also 

 List of NCAA Division I basketball arenas
 List of NCAA Division I ice hockey arenas
 List of indoor arenas by capacity
 List of U.S. stadiums by capacity
 List of swimming pools in the United States

References

 
Indoor arenas
United States